A383 may refer to:
 Autovía A-383, a highway in Andalusia, Spain
 A383 road (England), a road in Devon